The Royal Rodeo is a 1939 short American musical film starring John Payne. It was made by Warner Brothers.

Plot 
A young monarch, bored with responsibility and craving excitement, invites a traveling rodeo show to perform at his palace.

Full Cast & Crew

Directed by

Writing Credits

Cast (in credits order) complete, awaiting verification

Cinematography by

Film Editing by

Art Direction by

Costume Design by

Makeup Department

Sound Department

Costume and Wardrobe Department

Music Department

Other crew

References

External links

The Royal Rodeo at TCMDB

1939 films
1939 musical films
American musical films
Films set in a fictional country
Films set in Europe
Warner Bros. short films
1930s American films